LALL Lysi was a Cypriot football club based in Lysi. Founded in 1919, was playing sometimes in Second and sometimes in the Third Division.

After the Turkish invasion of Cyprus and occupation of Lysi in 1974, the team was dissolved.

References

Association football clubs disestablished in 1974
Defunct football clubs in Cyprus
Association football clubs established in 1919
1919 establishments in Cyprus
1974 disestablishments in Cyprus